Piptophyllum is a genus of plants in the grass family. The only known species is  Piptophyllum welwitschii, native to Angola.

References

Molinieae
Grasses of Africa
Endemic flora of Angola
Monotypic Poaceae genera